The 2013 European Beach Volleyball Championships were held from July 30 to August 4, 2013, in Klagenfurt, Austria.

External links
Official Website

European Beach Volleyball Championships
European Beach Volleyball
European Beach Volleyball
International volleyball competitions hosted by Austria
Sports competitions in Klagenfurt